Euclea, from the Greek eukleia meaning "glory and fame", denotes a group of flowering plants in the Ebenaceae or ebony family. They were described as a genus by Linnaeus in 1774. The genus includes evergreen trees and shrubs, native to Africa, the Comoro Islands and Arabia. Several species are used for timber, producing a hard, dark heartwood timber similar to ebony.

Species
There are some 16 to 18 species, including:

Euclea acutifolia E.Mey. ex A.DC. – Cape Province
Euclea angolensis Gürke – Angola
Euclea asperrima E.Holzh. – Namibia
Euclea balfourii Hiern ex Balf.f.
Euclea coriacea A.DC. – Lesotho, South Africa
Euclea crispa (Thunb.) Gürke – southern Africa
Euclea dewinteri Retief – Limpopo
Euclea divinorum Hiern – from Ethiopia to KwaZulu-Natal
Euclea lancea Thunb. – Cape Province
Euclea laurina Hiern ex Balf.f.
Euclea natalensis A.DC. – from Somalia to KwaZulu-Natal
Euclea neghellensis Cufod. – Ethiopia
Euclea polyandra (L.f.) E.Mey. ex Hiern – Cape Province
Euclea pseudebenus E.Mey. ex A.DC. – Angola, Namibia, Cape Province
Euclea racemosa L. – from Egypt to Cape Province; Comoros, Oman, Yemen
Euclea sekhukhuniensis Retief, S.J.Siebert & A.E.van Wyk – Mpumalanga
Euclea tomentosa E.Mey. ex A.DC. – Cape Province
Euclea undulata Thunb. – from Zimbabwe to KwaZulu-Natal

References

External links

 
Ericales genera